Under the Influence is a Canadian radio documentary series about marketing and advertising presented by former adman Terry O'Reilly. It premiered on January 7, 2012 on CBC Radio One and currently has over a million radio listeners per week as well as over 25 million podcast downloads.

The series serves as a follow up to two previous programs hosted by O'Reilly, O'Reilly on Advertising (2005) and The Age of Persuasion (2006-2011). While those shows focused primarily on advertising, this series focuses on marketing.

Episode guide

Season 1

Season One Episode Guide

Season 2

Season Two Episode Guide

Season 3

Season Three Episode Guide

Season 4

Season 5

Season Five Episode Guide

Season 6

Season 7

Season 9

Season 10

Season 11

Credits

 Terry O'Reilly - Creator, Writer, Producer, Host
 Debbie O'Reilly - Series Producer
 Keith Ohman - Sound Engineer
 Ian LeFeuvre and Ari Posner - Theme Music
 Sidney O'Reilly - Co-Writer, Digital Content Producer & Social Media Manager
 Callie O'Reilly - Graphic Designer, Audio Editor
 James Gangl, Jillian Gora, Allison Pinches, Abby Forsyth, & Patrick James Asselin - Researchers
 Lama Balaghi, Tanya Moryoussef, Margy Gilmour, Myra El-Bayoumi, Courteney Pitcher and Warren Brown - Past Researchers

References

External links
 
 Terry O'Reilly: Under the Influence

CBC Radio One programs
2012 radio programme debuts
Canadian talk radio programs
Radio documentaries about advertising
Canadian documentary radio programs
Canadian podcasts
2012 podcast debuts
Audio podcasts